Prey Veng is the capital of Prey Veng Province, located in southeastern Cambodia.

Geography
The town is located on National Road 11 between Nak Loeung and Kampong Cham. It is located about 2½ hours by road from Phnom Penh.

This quaint town is off the usual tourist trail and is uncrowded. It houses several old dilapidated colonial French Indochina era homes.

There is a large seasonal lake west of the city, which is usually dry from March to August.

References

External links

Cities in Cambodia
Populated places in Prey Veng province
Provincial capitals in Cambodia
Prey Veng province